The McAnulty College and Graduate School of Liberal Arts, part of Duquesne University in Pittsburgh, Pennsylvania, was founded as the College of Arts and Letters, part of the "Pittsburgh Catholic College" in 1878. The College was incorporated in 1882 with the authority to grant degrees in the arts and sciences. By 1911, the College and University Council of the Commonwealth of Pennsylvania extended the college's status to that of a university and approved the new name, Duquesne University.

Programs offered
The College confers two undergraduate degrees: Bachelor of Arts and Bachelor of Science. Majors offered as a B.A. include art history, classics, communication, digital media arts, economics, English, history, international relations, modern languages and literatures, multiplatform journalism, sports information and media, strategic public relations and advertising, philosophy, political science, psychology, sociology, studio art, and theology. Either the B.S. or a B.A. is conferred upon majors in computer science and mathematics.

Administration
The dean of the college is Dr. Kristine Blair. Dr. John Kern is  the associate dean.

References

http://www.sites.duq.edu/public-affairs/times/2009/Times-April-2009.pdf

School McAnulty
Liberal arts colleges at universities in the United States
Educational institutions established in 1878
1878 establishments in Pennsylvania